Princeton-Kauffman Memorial Airport  is a city-owned, public-use airport located two nautical miles (4 km) northwest of the central business district of Princeton, a city in Mercer County, Missouri, United States.

Facilities and aircraft 
Princeton-Kauffman Memorial Airport covers an area of 20 acres (8 ha) at an elevation of 858 feet (262 m) above mean sea level. It has one runway designated 18/36 with a turf surface measuring 2,475 by 100 feet (754 x 30 m). For the 12-month period ending April 30, 2011, the airport had 130 general aviation aircraft operations.

References

External links 
 Aerial image as of March 1997 from USGS The National Map

Defunct airports in Missouri
Airports in Missouri
Mercer County, Missouri